Graham William Joyce (22 October 1954 – 9 September 2014) was a British writer of speculative fiction and the recipient of numerous awards, including the O. Henry Award and the World Fantasy Award, for both his novels and short stories.

Biography 

He grew up in a small mining village just outside Coventry to a working-class family. After receiving a BEd degree from Bishop Lonsdale College in 1977 (now University of Derby) and an M.A. degree from the University of Leicester in 1980, Joyce worked as a youth officer for the National Association of Youth Clubs until 1988. He subsequently quit his position and moved to the Greek islands of Lesbos and Crete to write his first novel, Dreamside. After selling Dreamside to Pan Books in 1991, Joyce moved back to England to pursue a career as a full-time writer. He was awarded a PhD degree by publication at Nottingham Trent University, where he taught creative writing from 1996 until his death and was made a reader in creative writing.

Graham Joyce lived in Leicester with his wife and their two children.

Joyce was the regular first-choice goalkeeper for the England Writers football team, appearing in international fixtures against Germany, Italy, Sweden, Norway, Israel, Hungary, Turkey and Austrian Writers teams.  He described his footballing experiences in his non-fiction book Simple Goalkeeping Made Spectacular.

He was a supporter of Coventry City FC and occasionally wrote pieces for fanzines.

Joyce died on 9 September 2014. He had been diagnosed with lymphoma in 2013. Joyce's reaction to his cancer was to publish several essays on the "shocking clarity" the news had brought him on the subject of death. He said "your life is suddenly propelled along a remorseless narrative that has the structure of all great mythical journeys".

Style and themes 

Publishers and critics alike have found difficulty in classifying Joyce's writing. His novels have been categorized as fantasy, science fiction, horror, and mainstream literature—with some even overlapping genres. Joyce utilizes a wide variety of settings and character perspectives. Settings include Scotland, The English Midlands, Greece, the Middle East, and the jungles of Thailand. He has penned for both adult and juvenile protagonists, with an emphasis on strong female characters. The greater unity in Joyce's works, however, lies in their thematic and philosophical topics. Bill Sheehan, who wrote the introduction for Partial Eclipse, states:

American  author, editor and literary critic Jeff VanderMeer said:

The mystical or supernatural often play a pivotal role in Joyce's works. For this, he taps the mythical or folkloric associations of his settings. Joyce's treatment of these experiences is what distinguishes his novels from genre fiction. The supernatural is not seen as a conflict or an obstacle to be overcome, but rather an integral part of a natural order that a character must accept and integrate. Running parallel to these phenomena is the possibility of a rational or psychological explanation. This literary approach is influenced in part by Joyce's experiences with his own family:

This particular quality has prompted some critics to classify Joyce as a magic realist in the vein of such Latinamerican writers as Gabriel García Márquez or Julio Cortázar. Joyce disagrees with this, feeling that his lineage is tied more closely to writers of the English "weird tale" such as Arthur Machen or Algernon Blackwood. He calls his style of writing "Old Peculiar."

Film 

The short film Black Dust was released in 2012, produced by James Laws of Pretzel Films, scripted by Joyce and Laws. Currently, there are no feature-length films based on Joyce's novels or shorts. However, the film rights to Dreamside, The Tooth Fairy, and Dark Sister have all been optioned.  Dreamside, Do the Creepy Thing (Joyce scripting) The Silent Land and Some Kind of Fairy Tale are all in development.

Music 
Joyce co-wrote song lyrics for French songwriter and composer Emilie Simon on her albums The Big Machine (2009) and Franky Knight (2011).

Games 
On 16 January 2009, the site Computer and Video Games reported that Graham Joyce had been hired by id Software to "help develop the storyline potential" of Doom 4; after Joyce died in 2014, Adam Gascoine was brought in as a replacement.

Critical reception 
Adam Roberts stated "Graham Joyce's The Year of the Ladybird showed that he is one of the best writers of ghost stories we have."

Bibliography 
According to his official site and the Internet Database of Speculative Fiction, Graham Joyce published fourteen novels and twenty-six short stories.

Novels and short story collections

Short stories 
 "Monastic Lives" (1992)
 "The Careperson" (1992)
 "Last Rising Sun" (1992)
 "The Ventriloquial Art" (1993)
 "The Apprentice" (1993)
 "Under the Pylon" (1993)
 "Gap-Sickness" (1993)
 "Eat Reecebread" (1994) with Peter F. Hamilton
 "The Reckoning" (1994)
 "Black Ball Game" (1995)
 "A Tip from Bobby Moore" (1996)
 "The White Stuff" (1997) with Peter F. Hamilton
 "Pinkland" (1997)
 "The Mountain Eats People" (1998)
 "As Seen on Radio" (1998)
 "Leningrad Nights" (1999)
 "Candia" (1999)
 "Incident in Mombasa" (1999)
 "Horrograph" (1999)
 "Partial Eclipse" (2000)
 "Xenos Beach" (2000)
 "Coventry Boy" (2001)
 "Leningrad Nights" (2002)
 "The Coventry Boy" (2002)
 "First, Catch Your Demon" (2002)
 "Black Dust" (2002)
 "Tiger Moth" (2003)
 "The Oversoul" (2008) – first published in Who Can Save Us Now? (2008), edited by Owen King and John McNally
 "An Ordinary Soldier of the Queen" (2009)

Articles 
 "Working Class Monster" (June 2000)
 "Greek Virtues"
 "The Great God Pan"
 "Two weeks, three couples and six kids equals hell"

References

External links 

 
 
 Profile at Fantastic Fiction
 Literature map of Joyce
 Simon & Schuster profile page

Interviews 
 Interview at Actusf
 August 2007 interview. Located under "Fiction"
Graham Joyce at Worlds Without End

Academics of Nottingham Trent University
English science fiction writers
1954 births
2014 deaths
People from Coventry
English fantasy writers
Alumni of the University of Leicester
Alumni of the University of Derby
Ghost story writers
English horror writers
World Fantasy Award-winning writers
20th-century English novelists
20th-century British short story writers
English male novelists
O. Henry Award winners